Scherrer Arthur, alias Jacob, is a Ghanaian politician and a member of the Second and Third Parliament of the Fourth Republic representing the Mfantseman West Constituency in the Central Region of Ghana. He is member of the National Democratic Congress Party.

Politics 
Jacob was first elected into Parliament on the ticket of the National Democratic Congress during the December 1996 Ghanaian general election and was a member of Parliament from 7 January 1997 for the Mfantseman West constituency in the Central Region of Ghana.

Elections 
In 1996, he polled 19,172 votes out of the 21,904 valid votes cast representing 71.40% over his opponents Comfort Ohene-Darko a CPP member who polled 2,732 votes, Kenneth Appiah Mends a NCP member who polled 0 vote and Isaac Kow Taylor an NPP member who 0 vote. During the 2000 Ghanaian general election, he won with 16,018 votes which accounted for 40.00% of the total votes cast. He contested with other party representatives which includes; National Patriotic Party (NPP), National Reform Party (NRP), People's National Convention (PNC), and the Convention People's Party (CPP). These people won 38.40%, 2.10%, 0.80% and 21.90% of the total votes cast respectively. The total votes cast was 23,669.

Career 
Jacob is a former member of Parliament for the Mfantseman West Constituency in the Central Region of Ghana.

Personal life 
Jacob Scherrer Arthur is a Christian.

References 

Living people
National Democratic Congress (Ghana) politicians
People from Central Region (Ghana)
Ghanaian Christians
Ghanaian MPs 1997–2001
Ghanaian MPs 2001–2005
Year of birth missing (living people)